Marc-Philipp Zimmermann (born 22 March 1990) is a German professional footballer who plays as a forward for VfB Auerbach.

External links

1990 births
Living people
Association football forwards
Association football wingers
German footballers
Germany youth international footballers
FC Energie Cottbus II players
FC Energie Cottbus players
FC Carl Zeiss Jena players
FSV Zwickau players
VfB Auerbach players
2. Bundesliga players
3. Liga players
Regionalliga players
People from Spremberg
Footballers from Brandenburg